Erik Hilding Thedéen (born 1 September 1963) is a Swedish economist, business leader and civil servant, who served as Director General of the Swedish Financial Supervisory Authority from 2015 to 2022. Since 1 January 2023 he serves as the Governor of Sveriges riksbank, the central bank of Sweden.

Education and early life
After graduating from school in 1982, Thedéen completed his military service and continued his education at the Royal Swedish Naval Academy. Thedéen is a reserve officer in the Swedish Navy, trained for service on a patrol boat. Thedéen studied for a master's degree in economics at the Stockholm School of Economics 1985–1989.

Career
Thedéen has a history of roles in the financial industry, including roles as chief executive of KPA Pension, at the Swedish Ministry of Finance and as president of Nasdaq OMX Nordic in Stockholm.

References 

1963 births
Living people
People from Stockholm County
Swedish economists

Governors of Sveriges Riksbank
Stockholm School of Economics alumni
Swedish twins